Yamashita v. Hinkle, 260 U.S. 199 (1922), was a decision of the United States Supreme Court that upheld the constitutionality of the state of Washington's Alien Land Law. The law prohibited Asians from owning property. Washington's attorney general maintained that in order for Japanese people to fit in, their "marked physical characteristics" would have to be destroyed, that "the Negro, the Indian and the Chinaman" had already demonstrated assimilation was not possible for them. The U.S. Supreme Court heard the case, brought by Takuji Yamashita, and affirmed this race-based prohibition, citing its immediately prior issued decision in Takao Ozawa v. United States. Ozawa had upheld the constitutionality of barring anyone other than "free white persons" and "persons of African nativity or ... descent" to naturalize, and affirmed the racial classifications of previous court decisions.

Washington's Alien Land Law would not be repealed until 1966.

References

External links
 

 
1922 in United States case law
Asian-American issues
History of civil rights in the United States
History of immigration to the United States
Japanese-American history
United States equal protection case law
United States immigration and naturalization case law
United States Supreme Court cases
United States Supreme Court cases of the Taft Court
Race and law in the United States